{{DISPLAYTITLE:C10H16}}
The molecular formula C10H16 (molar mass: 136.24 g/mol) may refer to:

 Adamantane
 Camphene
 Carene
 Limonene
 Myrcene
 Ocimene
 Pentamethylcyclopentadiene
 Phellandrene
 Pinenes
alpha-Pinene
beta-Pinene
 Sabinene
 Syntin
 Terpinene
 Thujene
 Turpentine
 Twistane